Craterus or Krateros (c. 370 BC – 321 BC) was a Macedonian general under Alexander the Great and one of the Diadochi. Throughout his life he was a loyal royalist and supporter of Alexander the Great.  

Craterus was the son of a Macedonian nobleman named Alexander from Orestis and brother of admiral Amphoterus. Craterus commanded the phalanx and all infantry on the left wing in Battle of Issus in 333 BC. In Hyrcania he was sent on a mission against the Tapurians, his first independent command with the Macedonian army. At the Battle of the Hydaspes in 326 BC, near modern Jhelum, he commanded the rearguard, which stayed on the western bank; his men crossed the river only during the final stages of the battle.

At the festivities in Susa, Craterus married princess Amastris,  daughter of Oxyathres, the brother of Darius III. Craterus left Alexanders troops in Opis in 324. Craterus and Polyperchon were appointed to lead 11,500 veteran soldiers back to Macedonia and replace Antipater who was ordered to lead a fresh contingent of soldiers to join Aexanders army in the east. But Craterus arrival to Macedonia was delayed by a lack of vessels for the transport over the sea. Craterus stayed in Cilicia, where he was building the fleet, when Alexander unexpectedly died in Babylon. In case Craterus wouldn't be able to govern in Macedonia due to his health, his successor was to be Polyperchon. At the time, he had about 10,000 veterans with him. Craterus eventually crossed into Europe when Antipater requested assistance from several commanders in the Lamian war, but leaving the supreme command in possession of Antipater.  

He sailed with his Cilician navy to Greece and led troops at the Battle of Crannon in 322. When Antigonus rose in rebellion against Perdiccas and Eumenes, Craterus joined him, alongside Antipater and Ptolemy. He married Antipater's daughter Phila, with whom he had a son, also called Craterus. 

He was killed in battle against Eumenes in Asia Minor when his charging horse fell over him, somewhere near the Hellespont, in 321.

In popular media
Named with the phonetically accurate spelling of Krateros, Craterus is one of the minor characters in the historical novel Roxana Romance by A.J. Cave.
Also named as Krateros, Craterus is a major character in the two Alexander novels by Mary Renault, The Persian Boy and Fire From Heaven.
In the film Alexander, he is played by British actor Rory McCann.

References

External links 
Craterus (in Dictionary of Greek and Roman Biography and Mythology)
Biography from livius.org

370s BC births
321 BC deaths
Ancient Macedonian generals
Generals of Alexander the Great
Ancient Orestians
Ancient Macedonians killed in battle
Trierarchs of Nearchus' fleet